Otthia is a genus of fungi in the family Botryosphaeriaceae. There are about 76 species.

The genus name of Otthia is in honour of Gustav Heinrich Otth (1806-1874), who was a Swiss mycologist and military officer.

The genus was circumscribed by Theodor Rudolf Joseph Nitschke ex. Karl Wilhelm Gottlieb Leopold Fuckel in Jahrb. Nassauischen Vereins Naturk. vol.23-24 (Symb.Mycol.) on page 169 in 1870.

Species

Otthia aceris 
Otthia alnea
Otthia alni 
Otthia ambiens
Otthia amelanchieris
Otthia amica
Otthia artemisiae 
Otthia bertioides 
Otthia brunaudiana 
Otthia buteae 
Otthia caespitosa 
Otthia calligoni 
Otthia cassiae
Otthia castilloae 
Otthia clavata 
Otthia clematidis 
Otthia coryli
Otthia corylina
Otthia deformans 
Otthia dendrostellerae 
Otthia deviata 
Otthia diminuta
Otthia distegiae
Otthia doberae
Otthia dryadis 
Otthia elaeagni 
Otthia fendlericola 
Otthia flacourtiae 
Otthia fruticola
Otthia golovinii 
Otthia halimodendri 
Otthia haloxyli 
Otthia hazslinszkyi
Otthia helvetica 
Otthia hungarica
Otthia ilicis 
Otthia indica 
Otthia ingae 
Otthia jacquemontiae
Otthia lantanae 
Otthia lignyodes
Otthia lilacis
Otthia lisae 
Otthia lycii 
Otthia lyciicola 
Otthia monodiana
Otthia nikitinii 
Otthia ostryogena
Otthia panici
Otthia pavlovii 
Otthia populina
Otthia pteleae
Otthia pulneyensis 
Otthia pyri
Otthia quercicola
Otthia rhododendrophila
Otthia ribis
Otthia rubi 
Otthia rubicola 
Otthia selaginellae 
Otthia shearii 
Otthia smilacis 
Otthia spartii 
Otthia spiraeae 
Otthia staphyleae
Otthia staphylina
Otthia symphoricarpi
Otthia tamarindi 
Otthia taxi 
Otthia uleana 
Otthia ulmi 
Otthia urceolata
Otthia winteri
Otthia wistariae
Otthia xylostei
Otthia ziziphi-jujubae 

GBIF accepted species are one with added authors.

See also 
 List of Dothideomycetes genera incertae sedis

References

External links 

 Otthia at Index Fungorum

Botryosphaeriaceae